She'll Cut a Bitch is the second home video release and seventh Bravo stand-up comedy special by stand-up comedian Kathy Griffin, and her ninth overall.

Track listing

Personnel

Technical and production
Kathy Griffin - executive producer
Jenn Levy - executive producer
Paul Miller - executive producer
Kimber Rickabaugh - executive producer
David W. Foster - film editor
Bruce Ryan - production design
Gene Crowe - associate director

Visuals and imagery
Jennifer Montoya - hair & make-up
Josh Morton - sound re-recording mixer
Simon Miles - lighting designer

Award and nominations
The live Bravo performance special was nominated for the Emmy for Outstanding Variety, Music Or Comedy Special in the 61st Primetime Emmy Awards.

References

External links
Kathy Griffin's Official Website

Kathy Griffin albums
Stand-up comedy albums
2009 live albums